Rodrigo Sánchez Rodríguez (born 16 May 2000), commonly known as Rodri, is a Spanish professional footballer who plays for La Liga club Real Betis. Mainly an attacking midfielder, he can also play as a left winger.

Club career
Born in Talayuela, Cáceres, Extremadura, Rodri started his career with CP Talayuela, and subsequently represented EF Navalmoral before joining Real Madrid's La Fábrica in 2011. After spending the pre-season with the side, he was loaned to CD Canillas for a year before joining Atlético Madrid in 2012.

In June 2014, after a one-year spell at RCD Espanyol, Rodri joined FC Barcelona's La Masia. After leaving Barça in 2015, he then spent a year at Deportivo de La Coruña before joining Real Betis' youth setup in 2016.

Rodri made his senior debut with the reserves on 26 August 2018, coming on as a second-half substitute in a 3–0 Tercera División home win against Conil CF. He scored his first senior goal on 7 October, netting the third in a 8–0 home routing of CD Gerena, and renewed his contract until 2022 the following 27 March.

Rodri made his first team – and La Liga – debut on 7 November 2020, replacing Sergio Canales late into a 5–2 away loss against his former club Barcelona.

Career statistics

Club

Honours
Betis
Copa del Rey: 2021–22

References

External links
Profile at the Real Betis website
 
 
 

2000 births
Living people
Sportspeople from the Province of Cáceres
Spanish footballers
Footballers from Extremadura
Association football midfielders
Association football wingers
Spain under-21 international footballers
La Liga players
Segunda División B players
Tercera División players
CD Canillas players
Betis Deportivo Balompié footballers
Real Betis players